Igor Pavlov may refer to:

 Igor Pavlov (athlete) (born 1979), Russian pole vaulter
 Igor Pavlov (programmer), Russian freelance programmer, creator of 7-Zip
 Igors Pavlovs (born 1965), Latvian ice hockey player, ice hockey coach in Germany